Pichodi Chetilo Raayi is a 1999 Indian Telugu-language political satire film directed by Dasari Narayana Rao and starring himself.

Cast 
Dasari Narayana Rao as Sri Krishna Devaraya
Charan Raj as Chakradhara Rao 
Captain Raju as Maharadhi 
Chandra Mohan
Suthi Velu
A.V.S.
Sujatha
Brahmaji
Indraja
Sri Lakshmi

Reception
A critic from Sify opined that "On the whole, the film is a crude and vain attempt at criticising the present administration". Jeevi of Idlebrain.com said that "This film ends with a message that the vote should not become 'pichivadi chetilo raayi'".

Awards 
AP Cinegoer Awards
Best Comedy Actress - Sri Lakshmi

References

Indian political satire films
1999 films
1990s Telugu-language films